Eutachycines is a genus of cave or camel crickets in the subfamily Aemodogryllinae and tribe Aemodogryllini.  Originating in Asia, species have been found in Sri Lanka, southern China, Indo-China and west Malesia.

Species
The Orthoptera Species File lists:
Eutachycines annandalei Kirby, 1908
Eutachycines beybienkoi Gorochov, 1998
Eutachycines brevifrons Chopard, 1916
Eutachycines caecus Chopard, 1924
Eutachycines cassani Chopard, 1954
Eutachycines ceylonica Chopard, 1916
Eutachycines feai (Chopard, 1916) - type species (as Diestrammena feai Chopard)
Eutachycines gialaiensis Gorochov, 1994
Eutachycines hainani Gorochov, 2010
Eutachycines kongtumensis Gorochov, 1990
Eutachycines nigricauda Chopard, 1919
Eutachycines paulus Gorochov, 1992
Eutachycines vandermeermohri Willemse, 1936

References 

Ensifera genera
Rhaphidophoridae
Orthoptera of Asia
Orthoptera of Indo-China